Rio Sport d'Anyama is an association football club based in the town of Anyama, Côte d'Ivoire.

History
The club stadium is Stade de Rio Sports, seating 3,000 people.

The club's president is Amidou Sylla, credited with exercising a formative influence on Arouna Koné when Koné was at Rio Sport, before he went on to play professionally in Europe and represent Côte d'Ivoire internationally.

References

Football clubs in Abidjan
Association football clubs established in 1990
1990 establishments in Ivory Coast